Dave Schwep  is an American cinematographer, director, and producer.

Early career
Born in Maine and raised in Jacksonville, Oregon, Dave Schwep began his photography career at the age of 19 on the ski slopes of Big Sky Montana.  He then worked a 6-month commercial fishing venture in Alaska, traveled across country, and landed in South Beach, Miami where he shot fashion and glamour photography.  In 1999 Schwep moved to Hollywood and pursued a full-time career as a professional photographer.  He made his way through head shot, editorial, fashion, and event photography using film until the development of digital photography.  In digital photography, Schwep discovered his own unique process of creating signature art by using thousands of stills to create video. The result is an illusion of motion from a rapid succession of static pictures, Dreamsequences, his company.

Recent work
Through Dreamsequences, Schwep applied his unique process to advertising, television promos and in 2008 he expanded into cinematography and film production, creating his first short, "Bordeaux" (2008), starring "Hero's" Zachary Quinto. Schwep also took his cameras and signature process into both Peru, where he was the director of photography for the documentary, "Stepping into the Fire" (2011), and Haiti, where he continues to shoot for charitable organizations.  Recently, Schwep won best documentary at the 2012 HollyShorts Film Festival as director, cinematographer, and executive producer of "Bo" (2012), a journey to redemption. A sampling of his television credits include the popular shows House, Glee, Modern Family, It's Always Sunny in Philadelphia, American Idol, X Factor, and New Girl.

References

External links
 
 Short Documentary Film “BO” wins Best Documentary Short at the HollyShorts Film Festival
 MindGate TV and Dreamsequences Present the World Premiere of the Short Documentary Film “BO” at the Hollyshorts Film Festival
 Dave Schwep on Filmfestivals.org

Living people
American cinematographers
American directors
American film producers
Year of birth missing (living people)